Lagocheirus funestus is a species of longhorn beetles of the subfamily Lamiinae. It was described by Thomson in 1865.

References

Beetles described in 1865
Lagocheirus